Roseman University of Health Sciences is a private university focused on healthcare and located in Henderson, Nevada. It has a second campus in South Jordan, Utah. It was founded by Dr. Harry Rosenberg, enrolled its first class in January 2001, and was originally called the Nevada College of Pharmacy and the University of Southern Nevada.

Academics
The university offers Doctor of Dental Medicine, Doctor of Pharmacy, Bachelor of Science in Nursing and Master of Business Administration degrees. Roseman's programs are unique in that it utilizes a block system in which students focus on one topic at a time (rather than enrolling in multiple courses concurrently).

Roseman University of Health Sciences is licensed to operate in the State of Nevada by the Nevada Commission on Postsecondary Education. 
It is accredited by the Northwest Commission on Colleges and Universities (NWCCU).

The Roseman University of Health Sciences College of Pharmacy is accredited by the Accreditation Council for Pharmacy Education (ACPE). The college has an institutional membership in the American Association of Colleges of Pharmacy (AACP).

The Roseman University of Health Sciences College of Nursing holds full approval status with the Nevada State Board of Nursing. The college is also accredited by the National League for Nursing Accrediting Commission, Inc. (NLNAC).

Colleges and programs 

 College of Dental Medicine
 College of Medicine (in development; not yet open )
 College of Pharmacy
 College of Nursing
 Master of Business Administration Program

Name
The name of the institution is a portmanteau of the names of university president Rosenberg and Pharmacy School dean Dr. Renee Coffman.

See also

American Student Dental Association

References

External links
Official website

Private universities and colleges in Nevada
Educational institutions established in 2001
Universities and colleges accredited by the Northwest Commission on Colleges and Universities
Education in Henderson, Nevada
Universities and colleges in Clark County, Nevada
2001 establishments in Nevada
Private universities and colleges in Utah